Dubrovsky District is an administrative and municipal district (raion), one of the twenty-seven in Bryansk Oblast, Russia. It is located in the north of the oblast. Its administrative center is the urban locality (a work settlement) of Dubrovka. Population:   23,145 (2002 Census);  The population of Dubrovka accounts for 45.6% of the district's total population.

References

Notes

Sources

Districts of Bryansk Oblast